Mestolobes abnormis is a moth of the family Crambidae described by Arthur Gardiner Butler in 1882. It is endemic to the Hawaiian island of Oahu.

Adults have been taken at the flowers of Metrosideros species.

External links

Crambinae
Endemic moths of Hawaii
Moths described in 1882